Labor Pains is a 2009 American romantic comedy film directed by Lara Shapiro and written by Stacy Kramer. It stars Lindsay Lohan, Luke Kirby, Bridgit Mendler, Chris Parnell, Cheryl Hines, and Kevin Covais. The film was released theatrically on June 19, 2009, only in Europe, Latin America, and United Arab Emirates. In United States, the film premiered on ABC Family on July 19, 2009. It drew 2.1 million viewers, a better-than-average prime-time audience for ABC Family; according to the network, it was the week's top cable film among coveted female demographic groups. Labor Pains was released on DVD and Blu-ray on August 4 and 31 in the United States and United Kingdom, respectively.

Plot
Thea Clayhill is about to lose her position as secretary to a very cranky publisher. She decides to lie about being pregnant to save her job, after seeing on an episode of Law & Order that it is discriminatory to fire a pregnant woman. The plan works, and she gets to keep her job.

With help from her friend Lisa and a baby bump stolen from a mannequin, Thea fakes her pregnancy while figuring out her next move. In the meantime, her boss gets called out of town and his brother Nick takes over.

In an attempt to get author Suzie Cavandish to publish her new book about pregnancy with the company, Nick takes Thea to meet the author. Thea convinces Suzie that they are the right home for her book. Nick then launches a new parenting division at the publishing company and promotes Thea to be the editor. This results in a raise and promotion for Thea, as well as the beginning of a romantic relationship between her and Nick after breaking off her fake engagement with Miles. She begins to enjoy her life to the extent that her fake pregnancy becomes real to her.

In an attempt to get Thea to admit her lie to her family, her younger sister Emma throws Thea a surprise baby shower. When Thea still does not admit the lie, Emma destroys her pregnancy pillow in a fit of rage. Thea quickly grabs a balloon and leaves. Later that day, the author of the book is going to have a book reading, but Nick's brother, and Thea's boss, comes back a week early, and gets into an argument with Nick. Nick starts to physically fight with him, but Thea pulls them apart. After insulting Thea, she tries to go at him. Nick holds her back by the stomach, and her balloon pops, blowing her cover. After a couple of nights, Nick still does not answer the hundreds of messages Thea left him. She goes on a talk show to discuss the book Suzie wrote. Nick shows up to talk to her and they make up. After everyone leaves, Thea and Nick kiss until the lights go out.

Two years later, Thea, who is actually pregnant with her and Nick's daughter, goes into labor. Nick and Lisa push Thea towards the door in her desk chair.

Cast
Lindsay Lohan as Thea Clayhill
Luke Kirby as Nick Steinwald
Bridgit Mendler as Emma Clayhill
Chris Parnell as Jerry Steinwald
Cheryl Hines as Lisa DePardo
Kevin Covais as Greg
Aaron Yoo as Miles
Tracee Ellis Ross as Kristin
Willie Garson as Carl
Maree Cheatham as Ann
Bonnie Somerville as Suzie Cavandish
Jessica St. Clair as Pregnancy Class Instructor
Ana Ortiz as Donna
Janeane Garofalo as The Vista Host
Creed Bratton as John Abbotts
Pat Crawford Brown as Aunt Betty
Jay Thomas as Garth

Production
Labor Pains began as a production under Capitol Films in June 2007. Due to budget issues regarding another film, Nailed, Millennium Films Overnight Productions took over the film. The film is the directorial debut of Lara Shapiro. Filming began in Burbank, California, on June 9, 2008, and concluded on July 18, 2008. On September 3, 2008, a teaser trailer was released, listing the film as "post-production".

Lindsay Lohan was cast in the lead of Thea Clayhill in March 2008 after turning down the roles in All's Faire in Love and Manson Girls. Reportedly, only one insurance agency would take her after her two 2007 DUI arrests. Rick Schwartz, producer of the film, says, "I didn't know Lindsay before this, but we looked each other in the eye three months ago, and she has done everything I could have asked." Co-producer Celine Rattray said, "She has really impressed us with her work ethic. She is rehearsing every day with energy and focus. She is lovely to her co-stars and the crew."

Cheryl Hines said of Lohan: "Habitually, Lindsay achieves what to do in the first take."

On March 26, 2009, it was announced that Labor Pains would not receive a theatrical release in the United States, but instead would premiere on ABC Family on July 19, 2009.

Release

Box office
Labor Pains, titled Not A Bit of Pregnancy, was released on June 19, 2009, in Romania, grossing a total of $39,574. The film was released to theatres on July 9, 2009 in Russia, debuting at number four. It grossed $684,129. It was released on July 31, 2009 in Spain, grossing a total of $287,260. It was released in Mexico on January 8, 2010, bringing in $670,871. It was released on January 28, 2010 in Lebanon, grossing a total of $4,810. It was released in the United Arab Emirates on April 29, 2010, grossing a total of $65,432. Combined, the worldwide total gross is $1,755,233.

Critical reception
Labor Pains has received a 55 out of 100 on Metacritic, receiving mostly mixed reviews. The Los Angeles Times said that while Lohan's acting was amazingly appropriate, the screenwriting "offers an Olympian task for any star, involving as it does large and clunky leaps of logic over a cliché-riddled narrative landscape."

References

External links

Labor Pains at ABC Family

2009 films
2009 romantic comedy films
2000s pregnancy films
ABC Family original films
American romantic comedy films
2000s English-language films
Films shot in Los Angeles
American pregnancy films
2009 directorial debut films
2000s American films
English-language romantic comedy films